The white-line eelpout (Leucogrammolycus brychios) is a species of marine ray-finned fish belonging to the family Zoarcidae, the eelpouts. It is the only species in the monospecific genus Leucogrammolycus.

References

Lycodinae
Fish described in 2008